Ivide (English: Here) is a 2015 Indian Malayalam crime drama film directed by Shyamaprasad. The film has Prithviraj Sukumaran, Nivin Pauly and Bhavana in lead roles. The film was shot mostly in Atlanta, U.S. The soundtrack and background score were composed by Gopi Sundar. Cinematography was done by Eric Dickinson and editing by Manoj. The film was released on 29 May 2015.
Manoj was awarded Best Editor at the 2015 Kerala State Film Awards.
The music label for the movie is Muzik24

Plot 
Varun Blake is an Indian-born Atlanta police detective that is deeply affected by various incidents in his life like the loss of his biological family in India, the move to a predominantly white school in The States, and the death of his partner. He develops into a temperamental and disturbed man, forcing his Indian wife, Roshni to divorce him and move out of their home with their daughter. Varun then gets into a complicated rebound relationship with a local news reporter, Kate. After gaining American citizenship, Roshni gets a job at a newly outsourced Indian company based in Atlanta called InfoTech. She soon discovers that the company's young but successful director is her childhood friend, Krish Hebbar. The two starts seeing each other outside the office, much to Varun's dismay since he still has feelings for his ex-wife. Things take a turn for the worse when several Indian-born young men working for outsourced companies have been found murdered by a professional serial killer. The only link is that all the murder victims knew Krish. Varun brings him in for questioning but does not have enough evidence to arrest him. At around the same time, Krish's true colours are revealed when he blackmails his boss into giving him a promotion. On the dinner date night Roshni comes across a few pictures of the girl whom Krish had forced to go into the cabin of his boss. Seeing this Roshni confronts Krish and tells him that she does not hold any trust in him anymore. Krish tries explaining but couldn't and his plan to propose to her remains unfulfilled.
After more investigation, Varun learns that the real murderer is a former soldier who was fired from several jobs and were then taken by Indian immigrants. The soldier comes for Krish, who took over his job several years ago. He is finally saved by Varun. In the end, Krish marries Roshni and they move back to India to work for the Indian branch of their company to be closer to family.

Cast 

 Prithviraj Sukumaran as Varun Blake
 Nivin Pauly as Krish Hebbar
 Bhavana as Roshni Mathew
 Nirmal Sahadev as Aakash Murthy
 Dhanish Karthik as Sanjeev Menon
 Prakash Bare as Mahesh Murthi
 Christina Leidel as Kate Brown
 Lyndrez Leslie as Steve
 Alexandra Bartee as Amy Williams
 Yolanda Asher as Mary Blake
 Lee Armstrong as Paul Blake
 Savannah Rose Scaffe as Michelle Tratts
 Jia Patel as Trisha
 Shaun Xavier as Rohit Peter
 Deepti Nair as Akhila
 Jeff Rose as Rob
 Kara Michele Wilder as Rachel 
 Sunil Veettil as Sathish Reddy
 Tim Naddy as Parker
 Sathi Premji as Krish Hebbar's Mother
 Haridev as Nagesh Rao
 Juan Alexander as Police Officer
 Kirstein Gilbert as Secretary
 Robin Cole as Protester/Kid on Bus
 Bret Thompson as Police Officer

Release 
The movie was released on 29 May 2015.

Soundtrack

Critical reception 
The film opened to a mixed response from critics. The International Business Times rated the film 3.5 on a scale of 5, calling it a "decent film". Veeyen of NowRunning rated the movie 3 out of 5, calling it "a demanding film that dexterously holds a mirror up to contemporary life in the United States of America". Bollywood Chats praised the photography and the performance of some of the actors, but criticised the film for its lack of pace and its excessive length.

References

External links
 Official Facebook page
 

Indian crime drama films
2010s Malayalam-language films
Films shot in Atlanta
Films about Indian Americans